Gustavo Damián Canto (born 25 February 1994) is an Argentine footballer who plays as a centre-back for Arsenal de Sarandí.

References

External links
 
 
 

1994 births
Living people
Argentine footballers
Argentine expatriate footballers
Association football defenders
Racing de Córdoba footballers
Tiro Federal footballers
Club Atlético Sarmiento footballers
Ferro Carril Oeste footballers
Club Tijuana footballers
Dorados de Sinaloa footballers
Club Atlético Patronato footballers
Club Atlético Banfield footballers
C.S. Emelec footballers
Arsenal de Sarandí footballers
Primera Nacional players
Torneo Federal A players
Argentine Primera División players
Liga MX players
Ascenso MX players
Ecuadorian Serie A players
Argentine expatriate sportspeople in Mexico
Argentine expatriate sportspeople in Ecuador
Expatriate footballers in Mexico
Expatriate footballers in Ecuador
Sportspeople from Córdoba Province, Argentina